Sakellarios, genitive and feminine form Sakellariou, is a Greek surname deriving from the Byzantine office of sakellarios. 

The surname may refer to:

Alekos Sakellarios (1913-1991), film director
Alexandros Sakellariou (1887-1982), admiral and defence minister
Georgios Sakellarios (1765-1838), physician of Ali Pasha
Pericles A. Sakellarios (1905-1985), architect
Rita Sakellariou (1934-1999), singer

See also
 Sakellaridis
 Sakellaropoulos

Greek-language surnames
Surnames